Alexandros "Alexis" Falekas (born August 1, 1976) is a Greek retired professional basketball player, and current head coach of the Zhejiang Lions in the Chinese Basketball Association (CBA). At 1.90 m (6'2 ") in height, he played at the point guard position.

Professional career
Falekas started his pro career with Maroussi (1997–02), winning the FIBA Saporta Cup with them in 2001. He then moved to Panionios (2002–05), and then Kolossos (2005–06), and then AGE Chalkida (2006–07), Panorama (2007–08), and then to Ikaros Kallitheas (2008–11). He then played at AEK Athens from 2011 to 2014.

National team career
Falekas won a silver medal with Greece's under-26 national team selection at the 2001 Mediterranean Games.

Coaching career
Falekas began his coaching career in 2014, when he became an assistant coach with AEK Athens during the time that Vangelis Ziagkos was the head coach of the team. Later that season, he became the head coach of the cadets and juniors of the club.

External links
FIBA Europe Profile
Hellenic Federation Profile 
Eurobasket.com Profile
AEK.com Profile

1976 births
Living people
AEK B.C. players
AGEH Gymnastikos B.C. players
Competitors at the 2001 Mediterranean Games
Greek basketball coaches
Greek Basket League players
Greek men's basketball players
Ikaros B.C. players
Kavala B.C. players
Kolossos Rodou B.C. players
Maroussi B.C. players
Mediterranean Games medalists in basketball
Mediterranean Games silver medalists for Greece
Panionios B.C. players
Point guards
Basketball players from Athens